"Helen Morgan" was an American television play broadcast on May 16, 1957, as part of the CBS television series, Playhouse 90.  It was the 33rd episode of the first season of Playhouse 90.

Polly Bergen won the Emmy Award for her performance. The production also received Emmy nominations for Program of the Year and best directing by George Roy Hill. Sylvia Sidney and Hoagy Carmichael co-starred.

Plot
The teleplay follows the life of singer Helen Morgan from age 17 and through her work as a Chicago torch singer, on Broadway in George White's Scandals, and in Show Boat where she gained fame singing "Bill" and "Can't Help Lovin' Dat Man". The production also covers Morgan's alcohol abuse, her three marriages, and her death at age 41 from cirrhosis of the liver.

Cast
The following performers received screen credit for their performances:

 Polly Bergen as Helen Morgan
 Hoagy Carmichael as Marty Dix
 Sylvia Sidney as Lulu Morgan
 Robert Lowery as Roy Patterson
 Reginald Denny as George White
 Ronnie Burns as Bobby Talbot
 Lili Gentle as Marilyn Flood
 Benay Venuta as Texas Guinan
 James Westerfield as Frank Piggin (Morgan's father)
 Willard Sage as Forbes
 Lewis Charles as Esposito
 Grant Richards as Mike Baxter
 Paul Lambert as Kozek
 Eve McVeagh as Rita
 Glenn Turnbull as Broomstick Elliot
 Dan Frazier as Rally Speaker
 Benny Carter as himself
 Robin Morse as Proprietor
 Alfred Hopson as Customer
 Jimmy Cross as Comic
 Sidney Clute as Mike Monroe
 Jim Nolan as Cop
 Nicky Blair as Bootlegger
 Kerr as Ralph
 Mavis Palmer as Betty
 Burt Nelson as Bouncer
 Don Anderson as Stage Manager
 William Forrest as Doctor

Dana Wynter hosted the broadcast.

Production
Martin Manulis, the producer of Playhouse 90, purchased the television rights to the story from Morgan's mother, Lulu Morgan. In January 1957, Polly Bergen signed to play the lead role. She had previously been known for making commercials for Pepsi-Cola and as a panelist on "To Tell the Truth."

When Playhouse 90 acquired the television rights, Warner Brothers Pictures was already working on a motion picture version. Warner asked CBS to delay the television broadcast, but CBS declined and announced it would air its version on May 16.  The movie, titled The Helen Morgan Story, was released in October.

George Roy Hill directed the production. The teleplay was written by Leonard Spigelgass and Paul Monash, and Lulu Morgan was also given story credit. Albert Heschong was the art director.

The production was nominated for the Emmy Award for Program of the Year, but lost to another Playhouse 90 episode, The Comedian. Polly Bergen won the Emmy Award for best actress. George Roy Hill was also nominated for best direction (one hour or more).

Reception
In The New York Times, Jack Gould wrote that the production "had warmth, nostalgia and poignancy", though the telling of her backstage life "tended at times to be rather over-melodramatic." Gould also wrote that Hoagy Carmichael "dominated all his scenes in his usual effortless manner." As for Polly Bergen, Gould wrote that "her interpretation did not quite come off", though she "gave it a sincere and interesting try."

In The Boston Globe, Mary Cremmen called it "a triumph of home screen entertainment."

References

1957 American television episodes
Playhouse 90 (season 1) episodes
1957 television plays